Crouching can mean:

 A human posture usually considered to be synonymous with squatting 
 Al-Jathiya, a sura in the Qur'an

See also